Thiago Ezequiel Ojeda (born 12 January 2003) is an Argentine footballer who plays as a forward for Spanish club Villarreal CF B.

Club career
Born in Buenos Aires, Ojeda was a Vélez Sarsfield youth graduate. On 6 July 2022, he signed for Spanish side Villarreal CF after his contract expired, being initially assigned to the youth setup.

Ojeda made his professional with the reserves on 3 September 2022, coming on as a second half substitute for Diego Collado and scoring his team's third in a 3–0 Segunda División home win over CD Mirandés.

References

External links

2003 births
Living people
Footballers from Buenos Aires
Argentine footballers
Association football forwards
Segunda División players
Tercera Federación players
Villarreal CF B players
Villarreal CF C players
Argentine expatriate footballers
Argentine expatriate sportspeople in Spain
Expatriate footballers in Spain